Kargi is a village in Marsabit County, located in the north-eastern portion of Kenya.

Infrastructure

The town has a mosque, a catholic church, two primary schools, and a dispensary. The town also has a water pan to the north. Manyattas, or a group of huts forming a unit within a fence characterise the towns fringes.

Demographics

Kargi is estimated to be made up of 2,064 households, and 26% of its residents can read and write.

Geography

Kargi is located on the Korolle Oasis inside the Chalbi Desert. The oasis and town are a stop for the animals of the Rendille, Gabra and Borana to have a drink.

Climate

Kargi has a Tropical savanna climate.

History

In 2017, the Kenya Off-Grid Solar Access Project (KOSAP) was launched, which planned to provide energy to 277,000 households (1.3 million people) in remote, low density, and underserved areas of Kenya. It aimed to provide energy to towns like Kargi via mini-grids.

In 2020, residents from Kargi sued the state of Kenya over claims of poisonous materials being dumped in the area by international corporations. One of the companies mentioned being Amoco Petroleum, which explored for oil in the 1980s, and after no success, abandoned the project without properly cleaning. It is reported that the dumping of these materials has caused the deaths of 7,000 animals after contaminating water supplies.

In 2021, World Desertification and Drought Day was held on 17 June, where some 10,000 trees were planted.

Between 2020 to 2022, a drought occurred affecting the region heavily, and causing the deaths of many livestock in the town.

References

Populated places in Marsabit County